United States senators are conventionally ranked by the length of their tenure in the Senate. The senator in each U.S. state with the longer time in office is known as the senior senator; the other is the junior senator. This convention has no official standing, though seniority confers several benefits, including preference in the choice of committee assignments and physical offices. When senators have been in office for the same length of time, a number of tiebreakers, including previous offices held, are used to determine seniority. Per traditions, the longest serving senator of the majority party is named president pro tempore of the Senate, the second-highest office in the Senate and the third in the line of succession to the presidency of the United States.

Benefits of seniority 
The United States Constitution does not mandate differences in rights or power, but Senate rules give more power to senators with more seniority. Generally, senior senators will have more power, especially within their own caucuses. In addition, by custom, senior senators from the president's party control federal patronage appointments in their states.

There are several benefits, including the following:
 Traditionally, the most senior member of the majority party is named president pro tempore of the Senate.
 Senators are given preferential treatment in choosing committee assignments based on seniority. Seniority on a committee is based on length of time serving on that committee, which means a senator may rank above another in committee seniority but be more junior in the full Senate. Although the committee chairmanship is an elected position, it is traditionally given to the most senior senator of the majority party serving on the committee, and not already holding a conflicting position such as chairmanship of another committee. The ranking member of a committee (called the vice-chairman in some select committees) is elected in the same way.
 Greater seniority enables a senator to choose a desk closer to the front of the Senate Chamber.
 Senators with higher seniority may choose to move into better office space as those offices are vacated.
 Seniority determines the ranking in the United States order of precedence although other factors, such as being a former president or first lady, can place an individual higher in the order of precedence.

Determining the beginning of a term 
The beginning of an appointment does not necessarily coincide with the date the Senate convenes or when the new senator is sworn in.

General elections 
In the case of senators first elected in a general election for the upcoming Congress, their terms begin on the first day of the new Congress. For most of American history this was March 4 of odd-numbered years, but effective from 1935 the 20th Amendment moved this to January 3 of odd-numbered years.

Run-off elections and special elections 
In the case of senators elected in a run-off election occurring after the commencement of a new term, or a special election, their seniority date will be the date they are sworn in and not the first day of that Congress. A senator may be simultaneously elected to fill a term in a special election, and elected to the six-year term which begins on the upcoming January 3. Their seniority is that of someone chosen in a special election.

Appointments 
The seniority date for an appointed senator is usually the date of the appointment, although the actual term does not begin until they take the oath of office. An incoming senator who holds another office, including membership in the U.S. House of Representatives, must resign from that office before becoming a senator.

Determining length of seniority
A senator's seniority is primarily determined by length of continuous service; for example, a senator who has served for 12 years is more senior than one who has served for 10 years. Because several new senators usually join at the beginning of a new Congress, seniority is determined by prior federal or state government service and, if necessary, the amount of time spent in the tiebreaking office. These tiebreakers in order are:
 Former senator
 Former Vice President of the United States
 Former member of the United States House of Representatives
 Former member of the Cabinet of the United States
 Former state governor
 Population of state based on the most recent census when the senator took office

When more than one senator had such office, its length of time is used to break the tie. For instance, Jerry Moran, John Boozman, John Hoeven, Marco Rubio, Ron Johnson, Rand Paul, Richard Blumenthal and Mike Lee took office on January 3, 2011. The first two senators mentioned had served in the House of Representatives: Moran had served for 14 years and Boozman for nine. As a former governor, Hoeven is ranked immediately after the former House members. The rest are ranked by population as of the 2000 census. These ranked from 36th to 43rd in seniority when the 118th United States Congress convened.

If two senators are tied on all criteria, the one whose surname comes first alphabetically is considered the senior senator. This happened with Senators Jon Ossoff and Raphael Warnock, both of Georgia, who were sworn in on January 20, 2021. Because they were both newly elected senators from the same state, with no prior government service, no other tie-breaking criteria could be used. The Senate's official records, as well as the Democratic Caucus, thus consider Ossoff, whose name comes first alphabetically, as the senior senator, despite him being 17 years younger than Warnock.

Current seniority list 

Only relevant factors are listed below. For senators whose seniority is based on their state's respective population, the state population ranking is given as determined by the relevant United States census current at the time that they began service.

See also
List of current United States senators
List of current United States Senate committees
Seniority in the United States House of Representatives
List of members of the United States Congress by longevity of service

Notes

References